Devdas Chakraborty ( – February 4, 2008) was a Bangladeshi artist. He was awarded Ekushey Padak by the Government of Bangladesh for his contribution to fine arts in 1990.

Career
Chakraborty joined as a faculty member of the Department of Fine Arts at the University of Chittagong in 1973. After the death of his wife, he left his position at the university.

Works

Chakraborty began painting in oil and watercolor mediums. His initial works were figurative, and then in semi-abstracted and abstract. He later switched his interest to drawing and subsequently in printmaking.

Personal life
Chakraborty was married to  Saleha. Together they had two sons, Gautam and Rousseau.

Awards
 Ekushey Padak (1990)

References

1933 births
2008 deaths
Bangladeshi painters
Academic staff of the University of Chittagong
Recipients of the Ekushey Padak